Maurice Howard "Babe" Patt (January 31, 1915 – April 3, 1961) was a professional football player, who played in the National Football League for the Detroit Lions and the Cleveland Rams. Patt played End on offense and defense. His best offensive season was 1941 when he had 17 receptions for 163 yards and 1 touchdown. For his career, he caught 41 passes for 460 yards. He served in the United States Marines Corps during World War 2 and did not return to football after the war. He was born and died in Altoona, Pennsylvania.

External links

1915 births
1961 deaths
Carnegie Mellon Tartans football players
Detroit Lions players
Cleveland Rams players
Sportspeople from Altoona, Pennsylvania
Players of American football from Pennsylvania